The Curse of the Crying Woman (Spanish:  La maldición de la llorona) is a 1961 Mexican horror film (released in 1963), directed by Rafael Baledón. The film is about Amelia and Jaime, a married couple who travel to an old country house owned by Amelia's aunt Selma, who practices black magic. Selma tries to use her niece in order to resurrect "la llorona" (the crying woman), an ancient specter.

See also
La Llorona
List of ghost films

External links

 
Revista Cinefania
Turner Classic Movies

1961 films
1961 horror films
Mexican supernatural horror films
1960s Spanish-language films
Films set in country houses
La Llorona
1960s Mexican films